Tubifera is a genus of slime moulds from the subclass Myxogastria. The genus comprises 12 species.

Description
The fruit-bodies are aethalia formed from numerous, usually densely packed sporangia. The oblong sporangia are ochre, pink or red to dark brown and may be shiny or shimmering. They open at the tip to release the spores.

The hypothallus is spongy, occasionally raised to a stem-like, stock, dark-coloured structure or also, on Tubifera bombarda, soft and film-like thin. The membranous, single layered peridium outlasts the below half. A pseudocapillitium may or may not be present. The spores are light yellow to reddish-brown.

Habitat
Tubifera ferruginosa and Tubifera microsperma are more widespread and common than the other species from this genus. All species, except Tubifera casparyii, are also common in the tropics.

Classification
The genus was circumscribed in 1873 by Józef Thomasz Rostafiński. The type species is Tubifera ferruginosa, first characterized as a Stemonitis species.

Species
The genus comprises the following 12 species:

 Tubifera applanata
 Tubifera casparyii
 Tubifera corymbosa
 Tubifera dictyoderma
 Tubifera dimorphotheca
 Tubifera dudkae
 Tubifera ferruginosa
 Tubifera magna
 Tubifera microsperma
 Tubifera montana
 Tubifera papillata
 Tubifera pseudomicrosperma

Previously included species
 Alwisia bombarda (as Tubifera bombarda)

References

Myxogastria